Rafael Morera López (born 1 November 1903 in Lanzarote), known as Morera, was a Spanish professional association football player. He played with most of his career at Real Madrid C.F.

He played his career as a forward.

He scored 7 goals in 28 matches in La Liga, and 11 goals in 17 matches in Copa del Rey.  He also scored the first official league goal in El Clasico history, scoring in the tenth minute for Real Madrid in Barcelona on February 17, 1929.

Club

References
 
 Morera at Madridista.hu
 

Spanish footballers
Real Madrid CF players
Association football forwards